Chile puede (Spanish for: Chile can do it) is a 2008 Chilean comedy film about an illegal private Chilean space venture orchestrated by a mad tycoon that comes under the suspicions of the United States government, as an Arab and Al-Qaeda motivated anthrax-filled-satellite attack on the United States.

Plot
A group of scientists is working in the north of Chile, preparing for the first Chilean space mission. However, just before the launch, an industrial dispute breaks out between the scientists and engineers over wages and working conditions. They walk out of the ground control center, leaving the project director to launch the mission with astronaut Guillermo.

As the mission progresses, the director realizes that he does not know how to bring Guillermo back to Earth alive. Guillermo is left orbiting the Earth until an old Russian scientist, who worked on the Sputnik program and now lives in Chile, enters the scene. The Russian scientist contacts a cosmonaut who is on the old MIR space station and together they manage to force the Chilean spaceship back into Earth's orbit with a push.

Cast
Hugo Arana   ... First engineer
Bélgica Castro   ... Russian scientist
Javiera Contador ...  Ana María (girlfriend of Guillermo)
Boris Quercia ...  Guillermo, Spanish high school teacher, and mission's astronaut
Álvaro Rudolphy... Journalist
Willy Semler ...  Patricio, millionaire, mad mind, and financier

References

External links 
 
 

2000s science fiction comedy films
2008 films
Chilean comedy films
Films about astronauts
2008 comedy films
2000s Spanish-language films